Gonabad University of Medical Sciences is a medical sciences university in Gonabad, Razavi Khorasan, Iran. The university has four school including medicine, health, para-medicine, and nursing & midwifery.

References

External links
Official website

Gonabad County
Medical schools in Iran